The GP Industria & Artigianato di Larciano is a road bicycle race held annually in Larciano, Italy. After 2005, the race was organised as a 1.1 event on the UCI Europe Tour. Between 1967 and 1976 it was held as the Circuito di Larciano. In 2015 the race was not held but returned in 2016.

Past winners

References

External links
Official site 

 
Cycle races in Italy
UCI Europe Tour races
Recurring sporting events established in 1967
1967 establishments in Italy